Vapour Trails is the eleventh studio album by the experimental rock band Tuxedomoon. It was released in 2007 through Cramboy.

Track listing

Personnel 
Adapted from the Vapour Trails liner notes.

Tuxedomoon
 Steven Brown – saxophone, clarinet, keyboards, piano, organ, vocals
 Peter Dachert (as Peter Principle) – bass guitar, electric guitar, backing vocals, mixing
 Luc Van Lieshout – trumpet, flugelhorn, harmonica
 Blaine L. Reininger – violin, viola, guitar, keyboards, vocals
Additional musicians
 Nikos Papavranousis – drums (2, 4, 7)

Production and additional personnel
 Jonathan Barnbrook – design
 Coti – mixing
 Vincent Kenis – mastering
 Christos Lainas – engineering
 Lambros Syfris – engineering
 Tuxedomoon – production
 Alan Ward – mastering

Release history

References

External links 
 

2007 albums
Tuxedomoon albums
Crammed Discs albums